Under The Waterfall is the third album from Contemporary Christian music singer Cindy Morgan. It was released in 1995 by Word Records.

Renowned singer/pianist Michael W. Smith plays keyboards on the song "I'll Stand".

Track listing

His Sweet Embrace

 "Prelude To Grace" (Morgan) - 0:45
 "Sweet Days of Grace" (Morgan, Mark Hammond) - 3:59
 "Painted a Rainbow" (Morgan, Hammond, Kip Raines) - 5:20
 "Reaching With His Love" (Geoff and Becky Thurman, Doyle Tallent) - 4:56
 "Golden Rain" (Morgan) - 4:24
 "I Know You" (Morgan) - 4:38
 "Miracle In The Making" (Morgan) - 4:31

Pathway of Pain

 "Delilah" (Morgan, Hammond) - 4:06
 "Oh, How The Angels Are Falling" (Bob DeMoss) - 0:52
 "Angels Falling" (Morgan, Hammond) - 6:01
 "Last Days" (Morgan) - 4:06

Love's Refrain

 "I'll Stand" (Morgan, Hammond, Tommy Sims) - 4:04
 "Love's Sweet Name" (Morgan, Hammond) - 3:37

Personnel 
 Cindy Morgan – lead vocals (2-8, 10-13),  backing vocals (2, 3, 4, 7, 8, 10), additional acoustic piano (7)
 John Andrew Schneider – acoustic piano (1, 6, 11, 13), keyboards (11)
 Mark Hammond – keyboards (2, 3, 4, 6, 7, 8, 10, 12), bass (2, 3, 6, 7, 8, 10, 12), drums (2-8, 10, 12), backing vocals (3, 7), effects (9)
 Phil Madeira – Hammond B3 organ (3, 4, 12)
 Tommy Sims – acoustic piano (3), bass (4, 5)
 Brian Green – acoustic piano (4)
 Keith Thomas – keyboards (5), string arrangements (5)
 Michael W. Smith – acoustic piano (12)
 Dann Huff – guitars (3, 4, 12)
 Tom Hemby – guitars (6)
 David Hamilton – string orchestration and conductor (5, 13), string arrangements (13)
 The Nashville String Machine – strings (5, 13)
 Brent Barcus – backing vocals (2)
 Cheryl Rogers – backing vocals (4)
 Nicol Smith – backing vocals (4, 5, 10)
 Michael Mellett – backing vocals (5, 6)
 Celeste Hammond – backing vocals (6)
 Kip Raines – backing vocals (10)
 Andy Sutherland – vocal solo (10)

Voices on "Oh, How The Angels Are Falling
 Bob DeMoss, Magdeline Hammond, Suzzanne Maranic and Lois Smith

Choir on "I'll Stand"
 Angelo Petrucci, Veronica Petrucci, Cheryl Rogers, Shannon Sanders and Nicol Smith

Production 
 John Mays – executive producer
 Mark Hammond – producer
 Ronnie Brookshire – engineer
 Dave Dillbeck – engineer
 Todd Robbins – engineer, mix assistant
 Bill Whittington – additional engineer
 Dave Arnold – vocal recording (Track 9)
 Tony Peluso – mixing
 Pete Martinez – mix assistant
 Ronnie Thomas – editing
 Steve Hall – mastering 
 Brent Lenthall – production assistant
 Diana Barnes – art direction
 Ilene Weingard – design
 Michael Haber – photography 
 Mike Atkins – management 

Studios
 Recorded at Great Circle Sound and The Rec Room (Nashville, TN); Focus on the Family (Colorado Springs, CO).
 Mixed at Sixteenth Avenue Sound (Nashville, TN).
 Edited at MasterMix (Nashville, TN).
 Mastered at Future Disc (North Hollywood, CA).

References

1995 albums
Cindy Morgan (singer) albums